Kayla Marie Whitelock  (née Sharland, born 30 October 1985) is a New Zealand field hockey player, and former captain of the New Zealand women's national field hockey team (the Black Sticks Women). She has competed in four  Olympic Games (2004, 2008, 2012 and 2016), three Commonwealth Games (2006, 2010 and 2014) and two Hockey World Cups (2010 and 2014). She was named on the FIH's All-Star Team in 2010 and was Hockey New Zealand's player of the year in 2012.

Biography
Whitelock was born in Palmerston North, and is of Rangitāne descent. She married Crusaders rugby player George Whitelock in December 2013.

Whitelock took up hockey at the age of seven, as her school only played hockey, not her preferred sport, netball.

In the 2020 Queen's Birthday Honours, Whitelock was appointed a Member of the New Zealand Order of Merit, for services to hockey.

International senior competitions
 2003 – Champions Challenge, Catania.
 2004 – Olympic Qualifying Tournament, Auckland.
 2004 – Olympic Games, Athens.
 2004 – Champions Trophy, Rosario.
 2005 – Champions Challenge, Virginia Beach.
 2006 – Commonwealth Games, Melbourne
 2006 – World Cup Qualifier, Rome
 2008 – Olympic Games, Beijing

References

External links
 

1985 births
Living people
Sportspeople from Palmerston North
New Zealand female field hockey players
New Zealand Māori sportspeople
Olympic field hockey players of New Zealand
Field hockey players at the 2004 Summer Olympics
Field hockey players at the 2006 Commonwealth Games
Field hockey players at the 2008 Summer Olympics
Field hockey players at the 2010 Commonwealth Games
Field hockey players at the 2012 Summer Olympics
Field hockey players at the 2014 Commonwealth Games
Commonwealth Games silver medallists for New Zealand
Commonwealth Games bronze medallists for New Zealand
Field hockey players at the 2016 Summer Olympics
Rangitāne people
Commonwealth Games medallists in field hockey
Dalzell-Whitelock family
Members of the New Zealand Order of Merit
Medallists at the 2014 Commonwealth Games